The Evante, designed and invented by George Walter Robinson, is an English automobile which began production in 1987 in Spalding, Lincolnshire, England. Engine tuning company Vegantune had been restoring Lotus Elan cars and making some improvements to them. They decided to build a complete new car and set up a separate company, Evante Cars Ltd, to make them.

The car's looks were heavily inspired by the Lotus Elan and it was powered by the Ford Kent based Vegantune VTA 1.6 and later 1.7-litre twin overhead cam engine driving the rear wheels through a gearbox originally from a Ford Sierra. The fibreglass body and carbon-fibre was mounted onto a space frame chassis with independent suspension all round. Disc brakes were fitted front and rear.

The cars were intended to be available as either complete or in kit form but all cars were supplied fully built and were produced at a rate of about one a week. The bodies were fitted out with leather seats, walnut dashboard and electric windows.

Production stopped in 1991 when the original company failed, but the design was bought by Fleur de Lys who specialised in making retro styled vans. They redeveloped the car to take a Ford Zetec 1.8 Litre engine, but only nine more cars were made.

An attempt was made to revive the car in 2001, but this was unsuccessful. Spydercars Whittlesey now own the rights to the name and the fibre glass moulds.

See also
 List of car manufacturers of the United Kingdom

References

David Burgess Wise, The New Illustrated Encyclopedia of Automobiles.
Evante club

Motor vehicle manufacturers of England
Sports cars
Retro-style automobiles
Companies based in Lincolnshire
1983 establishments in England
1994 disestablishments in England
Vehicle manufacturing companies established in 1983
Vehicle manufacturing companies disestablished in 1994